Kobeliarovo (1466 Fekethepathak,. 1551 Kobelar, 1773 Kobelarow ) is a village and municipality in the Rožňava District in the Košice Region of middle-eastern Slovakia.

History
In historical records the village was first mentioned in 1466 as Bebek noble family's property. In the 17th century, noble Hungarians Andrássy ruled the village.

Geography
The village lies at an altitude of 461 metres and covers an area of 12.029 km².
It has a population of about 435 people.

Culture
The village has a public library.

Famous people
Pavel Jozef Šafárik, scientist

Genealogical resources

The records for genealogical research are available at the state archive "Statny Archiv in Kosice, Slovakia"

 Lutheran church records (births/marriages/deaths): 1744-1952 (parish A)

See also
 List of municipalities and towns in Slovakia

References

External links
 Kobeliarovo - Official homepage
 Kobeliarovo
Surnames of living people in Kobeliarovo

Villages and municipalities in Rožňava District